Roop's Mill is a historic grist mill complex located near Westminster, Carroll County, Maryland.  The complex includes a three-story, brick and stone mill, dating from about 1795 and rebuilt in 1816; the David Roop House, an 1825 stone dwelling; a log cooper's shed; an early two-part bank barn; numerous farm sheds; a late-19th century iron suspension bridge; and a bank barn dated to the 1860s.  The brick mill was constructed according to the designs of Oliver Evans.

It was listed on the National Register of Historic Places in 2008.

References

External links
 at Maryland Historical Trust
Millpictures.com website
The Spa at Roop's Mill website

Grinding mills in Maryland
Industrial buildings completed in 1795
Buildings and structures in Carroll County, Maryland
National Register of Historic Places in Carroll County, Maryland
Grinding mills on the National Register of Historic Places in Maryland